Arhopala staudingeri is a species of butterfly in the family Lycaenidae. It was described by Georg Semper in 1890. It is found in the Indomalayan realm, where it is endemic to the Philippines.

The forewing length is about 21 mm. The nominotypical subspecies is distributed on Bohol, Leyte, Panaon, Mindanao and Samar islands. The subspecies A. s. castagnedai is on Luzon and Marinduque islands. The subspecies A. s. negrosiana is found on Negros Island.

Subspecies
A. s. staudingeri – Philippines (Mindanao)
A. s. negrosiana (Hayashi, 1981) – Philippines (Negros)
A. s. castagnedai Osada & Hashimoto, 1987

Etymology
The specific name honours Otto Staudinger.

References

 Hayashi, Hisakazu (1981). "New Lycaenid Butterflies from the Philippines". Tyô to Ga. 32 (1,2): 63–82.
 Treadaway, Colin G. (1995). "Checklist of the butterflies of the Philippine Islands". Nachrichten des Entomologischen Vereins Apollo. Suppl. 14: 7–118.
 
 Treadaway, Colin G. & Schrőder, Heintz G. (2012). "Revised checklist of the butterflies of the Philippine Islands (Lepidoptera: Rhopalocera)". Nachrichten des Entomologischen Vereins Apollo. Suppl. 20: 1-64.

External links

Arhopala
Butterflies described in 1890